The following are notable international schools in India. Such schools follow an international curriculum (such as International Baccalaureate, Edexcel or Cambridge International Examinations) or they follow a specific national curriculum different from curricula common to India.

Andhra Pradesh

 Greenfield International School - Kakinada
 Oakridge International School - Visakhapatnam

Bihar

 Ark International School, Begusarai

Delhi

 The British School, New Delhi
 German School New Delhi
 Japanese School New Delhi
 Lycée Français de Delhi
 Russian Embassy School in Delhi
 Ryan International School

New Delhi

 Amity International School
 The Mother's International School
 Ryan International School
 Tagore International School

Gujarat

 Ahmedabad International School
  Ashadeep International School, Surat
 Fountainhead School
 Ryan International School
 VIBGYOR Group of Schools

Haryana

 Heritage Xperiential Learning School, Gurgaon
 Lancers International School
 Meenakshi World School
 Ryan International School 
 VIBGYOR Group of Schools 
 Vidya Sanskar International School

Karnataka

Bangalore

 Bangalore International School
 Candor International School
 Canadian International School
 Ebenezer International School Bangalore
 Greenwood High International School
 Indus International School
 The International School Bangalore
 Inventure Academy
 Jain Heritage School
 Jain International Residential School
 Oakridge International School
 Ryan International School
 Stonehill International School
 Treamis World School
 Trio World School
 VIBGYOR Group of Schools
 Vidyashilp Academy

Mangalore

  Cambridge School
 Canara High School
 Delhi Public School
 Podar International School
 Presidency School
 Ryan International School
 VIBGYOR Group of Schools

Mysore

 The Learning Curve International School
 Phoenix International Academy, Mysore

Kerala

Kochi

 The Charter School (chain) 
 Ryan International School

Trivandrum

 The Charter School (chain)
 Christ Nagar School, Thiruvananthapuram
 The Oxford School
 Trivandrum International School

Maharashtra

 Anubhuti School
 Ryan International School
 Symbiosis International School
 VIBGYOR Group of Schools
 Victorious Kidss Educares

Mumbai

 Avalon Heights International School
 BD Somani International School
 C P Goenka International School
 Dhirubhai Ambani International School
 DSB International School (German)
 Ecole Mondiale World School
 Edubridge International School
 French International School of Bombay
 Islamic International School
 Japanese School of Mumbai
 JBCN International School
 Mount Litera School International
 Oberoi International School
 Podar International School
 RBK International Academy
 Ryan International School 
 Singapore International School
 Utpal Shanghvi School
 Vibgyor High International School

Odisha

 KIIT International School – Bhubaneswar
 Sai International School, Bhubaneswar

Punjab

 Oakridge International School - Mohali
 Ryan International School

Rajasthan

 Ryan International School 
 Sanskar International School

Tamil Nadu

 Excel Global School
 Good Shepherd International School, Ooty
 Hebron School, Ooty
 Kodaikanal International School
 St. Peters International School, Kodaikanal
 SCAD World School. Palladam, Coimbatore
 VIBGYOR Group of Schools

Chennai

 Akshararbol International School
 Chennai Public School
 École Franco-Indienne Sishya
 German International School Chennai
 Islamic International School
 Lalaji Memorial Omega International School
 MCTM Chidambaram Chettyar International IB School
 Ryan International School

Telangana

Hyderabad

 Aga Khan Academy
 CHIREC International
 Glendale Academy
 Indus International School
 International School of Hyderabad
 Lakshanika International School
 Oakridge International School

Uttar Pradesh

 Laurels International School
 Ryan International School
 VIBGYOR Group of Schools
 City Montessori School

Uttarakhand

 Tula's International School
 Woodstock School
 Ecole Globale International Girls' School
 Mussoorie International School

West Bengal

Kolkata

 Bridge International School
 Calcutta International School
 Oaktree International School, Kolkata
 South City International School
 Adamas International School

See also

 List of schools in India
 List of international schools
 List of boarding schools in India
 List of Global Schools Foundation schools

References

 
International
India